The 2019 Indian general election were held in Rajasthan in two phases- 29 April and 6 May 2019 to constitute the 17th Lok Sabha.

Results

Assembly segments wise lead of parties

Candidates

References

Indian general elections in Rajasthan
2010s in Rajasthan
Rajasthan